Rodney Matthews (born 6 July 1945) is a British illustrator and conceptual designer of fantasy and science-fiction.

Career 
Trained at the West of England College of Art, Matthews worked in advertising for Plastic Dog Graphics before turning freelance in 1970, initially under the name Skyline Studios.

Matthews has painted over 140 subjects for record album covers, for many rock and progressive rock bands. More than 90 of his pictures have been published worldwide, selling in poster format, as well as many international editions of calendars, jigsaw puzzles, postcards, notecards, snowboards and T-shirts. His originals have been exhibited throughout the UK and Europe. He has been a regular exhibitor at the Chris Beetles Gallery, in London's West End, where he met English comedian, actor, writer and producer John Cleese, an avid collector of his work.  

Matthews has illustrated numerous books, including those by English fantasy and science fiction author Michael Moorcock. Their collaboration in the 1970s resulted in a series of 12 large posters, depicting scenes from Moorcock's Eternal Champion series. These images were also used for a 1978 calendar entitled "Wizardry and Wild Romance".

In 1998, Matthews and the late Gerry Anderson completed Lavender Castle, a 26-episode stop-motion CGI animation series for children. It was produced at Cosgrove Hall Films in Manchester and purchased by ITV for the UK. Matthews has also contributed concept designs for the 2005 film The Magic Roundabout.

He supplied conceptual designs for computer games such as the Sony/Psygnosis game Shadow Master and Haven: Call of the King, published by Midway. Matthews has produced some publicity and a logo for the green energy company Ecotricity.

He has also written lyrics and played drums on a music album influenced by his images; American guitarist Jeff Scheetz, John Payne (Asia) on bass guitar, Oliver Wakeman (Yes) on keyboards and Pete Coleman (composer and multi-instrumentalist).

Album covers 

Album covers (including EPs, LPs and DVDs):
 1965, Pentworth's People, demo cover
 1971, Thin Lizzy, New Day (EP)
 1971, Fred Wedlock, The Folker
 1971, Ian A. Anderson, A Vulture Is Not a Bird You Can Trust
 1971, Pigsty Hill Light Orchestra, Piggery Jokery
 1971, Various artists, The Great White Dap (EP)
 1972, Amon Düül II, Live in London
 1972, Dave Evans, Elephantasia
 1972, Hillbilly Jazz, Vol. 1
 1972, Hillbilly Jazz, Vol. 2
 1972, Hunt & Turner, Magic Landscape
 1972, Ian A. Anderson, Singer Sleeps on as Blaze Rages
 1972, Various artists (feat. Little Richard, Sam Cooke and more), This Is How It All Began
 1973, Al Jones, Jonesville
 1973, Art Rosenbaum, Five String Banjo
 1973, Bola Sete, Ocean
 1973, Captain Lockheed and the Starfighters, Ejection (EP)
 1973, Dave Carlsen (feat. Noel Redding, Keith Moon & Spencer Davis), Pale Horse
 1973, David Stone & Allan Schiller, Delius
 1973, Fred Wedlock, Frollicks
 1973, Hamish Imlach, All Round Entertainer
 1973, Stefan Grossman, Aunt Molly's Murray Farm
 1973, Stefan Grossman, Contemporary Ragtime Guitar
 1973, The Dartington String Quartet, Shostakovich
 1974, Brinsley Schwarz, Golden Greats
 1974, Geoffrey Woodruff, Live (6" LP)
 1974, Old Pete, Old Pete (6" LP)
 1974, Old Pete, Old Pete's Christmas Story (6" LP)
 1974, Various artists, Some People Play Guitar Like a Lotta People Don't!
 1975, Halfbreed, Halfbreed
 1976, 20th Century Steel Band, Yellow Bird Is Dead
 1977, Bo Hansson, Music Inspired by Lord of the Rings
 1979, Nazareth, May The Sun Shine (single)
 1979, Nazareth, No Mean City
 1980, Magnum, Chase the Dragon
 1980, Praying Mantis, Praying Mantis (single)
 1980, Praying Mantis, Time Tells No Lies
 1981, Praying Mantis, Cheated (EP)
 1981, Tygers of Pan Tang, Crazy Nights
 1982, Bitches Sin, Predator
 1982, Diamond Head, Borrowed Time
 1982, Eloy, Planets
 1982, Eloy, Time to Turn
 1982, Scorpions, Lonesome Crow
 1983, Magnum, The Eleventh Hour
 1984, Eloy, Metromania
 1984, Tigermoth, Tigermoth
 1985, Magnum, On a Storyteller's Night
 1986, Motherlode, The Sanctuary
 1987, Diamond Head, Am I Evil
 1987, Magnum, Mirador
 1988, Magnum, Kingdom of Madness
 1988, Magnum, Magnum II
 1988, Tigermoth, Howling Moth
 1989, Full Moon, Full Moon
 1989, Magnum, Foundation
 1990, Detritus, Perpetual Defiance
 1990, Seventh Angel, The Torment
 1991, Praying Mantis, Predator in Disguise
 1991, Rick Wakeman, 2000 A.D. Into the Future
 1991, Seventh Angel, Lament for the Weary
 1991, White Metal Warriors, Last Ship Home
 1992, Asia, Aqua
 1992, Asia, Who Will Stop the Rain? (single)
 1992, Magnum, Only in America (single)
 1992, Magnum, Sleepwalking
 1992, Rudi Dobson & Rodney Matthews, The House on the Rock
 1992, Veni Domine, Fall Babylon Fall
 1993, Barclay James Harvest, Caught in the Light
 1993, Gethsemane Rose, Tattered 'N' Torn
 1993, Magnum, Archive
 1993, Magnum, Keeping the Nite Light Burning
 1993, Stairway, No Rest: No Mercy
 1994, Rodd & Marco, Jurassic Church
 1994, Veni Domine, Material Sanctuary
 1995, Asia, Arena
 1995, Rick Wakeman, The New Gospels
 1995, Tradia, Welcome to Paradise
 1996, Asia, Archiva Vol. 1
 1996, Asia, Archiva Vol. 2
 1996, Crucifer, Hellbound Angel
 1997, Magnum, Stronghold
 1999, Oliver Wakeman & Clive Nolan, Jabberwocky
 2000, Doug King, The Snugldorfs
 2003, Asia, Different Worlds Live
 2003, Asia, Live in Moscow (DVD)
 2003, Barclay James Harvest, 25th Anniversary Concert (DVD)
 2003, Hawkwind, Welcome to the Future (2CD/DVD Box)
 2003, Magnum, A Winter's Tale (DVD)
 2003, Squidd, Twice Upon a Time (3 Track CD)
 2003, Steve Hackett, Horizons (DVD)
 2003, Uriah Heep, Live in the USA (DVD)
 2003, Various artists (feat. Fairport Convention, Lindisfarne, The Strawbs and more), Folk Rock Anthology (DVD)
 2003, Various artists (feat. Black Sabbath, Deep Purple, Saxon and more), Hard Rock Anthology (DVD)
 2003, Various artists (feat. Keith Emerson, Jon Lord, Rick Wakeman and more), Keyboard Wizards (DVD)
 2003, Various artists (feat. Lynard Skynyrd, Free, Asia, Magnum and more), Rock Anthems (DVD)
 2003, Various artists (feat. Mick Box, Steve Howe, Jan Akkerman, Toni Iommi and more), The Guitar Wizards: Presented By Mick Box (DVD)
 2003, Various artists (feat. Uriah Heep, Asia, Nektar and more), The International Classic Rock Festival (DVD)
 2003, Various artists (feat. Emerson, Lake & Palmer, Focus, Rick Wakeman and more), The Progressive Rock Anthology (DVD)
 2003, Various artists (feat. Caravan, Curved Air, Family and more), The Underground Anthology (DVD)
 2004, John Lawton Band, Shakin' the Tale (CD/DVD)
 2004, Uriah Heep, Magic Night (CD/DVD)
 2005, Russell Allen & Jørn Lande, The Battle
 2006, Nazareth, The Very Best of Nazareth
 2007, Magnum, Princess Alice and the Broken Arrow
 2007, Russell Allen & Jørn Lande, The Revenge
 2007, Stormzone, Caught in the Act
 2008, Bob Catley, Immortal
 2008, Hawkwind, Out of the Shadows (CD/DVD)
 2008, Jeff Scheetz, Behind the Mask
 2008, Magnum, Wings of Heaven Live
 2008, V-Rats, Intelligent Design
 2009, Magnum, Into the Valley of the Moon King
 2009, Roxxcalibur, NWOBHM For Muthas
 2010, Magnum, The Gathering
 2010, Russell Allen & Jørn Lande, The Showdown
 2010, Stairway, Interregnum
 2011, Atkins May Project, Serpent's Kiss
 2011, Magnum, The Visitation
 2011, Roxxcalibur, Lords of the NWOBHM
 2012, Atkins May Project, Valley of Shadows
 2012, Frog Riders, Utterly Spontaneous
 2012, Geoff Whitely Project, Confidential Whispers
 2012, Magnum, On the 13th Day
 2012, Tygers of Pan Tang, Ambush
 2013, Avantasia, The Mystery of Time
 2013, Geoff Whitely Project, Yetoto
 2014, Atkins May Project, Empire of Destruction
 2014, Jeff Scheetz, Rodney Matthews & Friends (John Payne, Oliver Wakeman, Bob Catley & Pete Coleman), I Saw Three Ships (Single)
 2014, Magnum, Escape from the Shadow Garden
 2014, Rick Wakeman, Fields of Green
 2015, Nazareth, No Means of Escape
 2015, Praying Mantis, Legacy
 2015, Starquake, Times That Matter
 2016, Magnum, Sacred Blood "Divine" Lies
 2016, Seeing Red, Keep the Fire Burning
 2016, The Rolling Stones, Another Time, Another Place
 2017, The Rolling Stones, Time on Our Side
 2017, The Rolling Stones, Painted Black
 2018, Magnum, Lost on the Road to Eternity
 2018, The Dukes of the Orient, The Dukes of the Orient
 2018, Praying Mantis, Gravity
 2020, Ellesmere, Wyrd
2021, Blind Golem, A Dream of Fantasy

Books 

Anthologies:
 1985, Rodney Matthews & Nigel Suckling, In Search of Forever, Dragon's World (n.b. there is also a Japanese edition; there was also a UK book club edition, published by Guild).
 1989, Rodney Matthews & Nigel Suckling, Last Ship Home, Dragon's World.
 1990, Rodney Matthews & Nigel Suckling, Voyages Extrêmes, Vents d'Ouest (n.b. this is the French edition of Last Ship Home).
 1997, Rodney Matthews & Nigel Suckling, Countdown to Millennium, Collins & Brown.

Portfolios:
 1990, Rodney Matthews & Nigel Suckling, The Rodney Matthews Portfolio, Dragon's World.
 1993, Rodney Matthews & Pauline Fisk, The 2nd Rodney Matthews Portfolio, Dragon's World.
 1994, Rodney Matthews & Nigel Suckling, Rodney Matthews (Paper Tiger Miniatures), Paper Tiger.

Illustrated books:
 1974, The Blue Planet Series: Book 1: Blast Off!, Childs Play (International) Ltd.
 1974, The Blue Planet Series: Book 2: The Journey, Childs Play (International) Ltd.
 1974, The Blue Planet Series: Book 3: On the Planet, Childs Play (International) Ltd.
 1974, The Blue Planet Series: Book 4: Back to Earth, Childs Play (International) Ltd.
 1978, Rodney Matthews & Graham Smith, Yendor: The Journey of a Junior Adventurer, Big O Publishing.
 1980, Michael Moorcock, Stormbringer, United States: Archival Press.
 1986, Cheryl Evans & Anne Millard, Usborne Illustrated Guide to Norse Myths and Legends, Usborne.
 1987, Cheryl Evans & Anne Millard, Usborne Illustrated Guide to Greek Myths and Legends, Usborne.
 1987, Cheryl Evans & Anne Millard, The Usborne Book of Greek and Norse Legends, Usborne.
 1987, Michael Moorcock: A Collaboration with Rodney Matthews, Elric at the End of Time, Dragon's World.
 1994, Felicity Brooks, Tales of King Arthur, Usborne.
 1998, Felicity Brooks, Tales of King Arthur & His Knights, Usborne.
 1999, Doug King & Rodney Matthews, The Snugldorfs – Smile God Loves You! United States: Cepher.
 2008, Lewis Carroll, Alice in Wonderland, Templar (foreword by John Cleese).
 2010, Rodney Matthews & Marco Palmer, The Fantastic Intergalactic Adventures of Stanley & Livingston, Rodney Matthews Studios.

Paperback covers:

Stephen R. Lawhead:
 1990, The Paradise War, Lion Books.
 1991, The Silver Hand, Lion Books.
 1992, The Endless Knot, Lion Books.

A. Merritt:
 1977, The Face in the Abyss, New York: Avon Books.
 1977, The Moon Pool, New York: Avon Books.

Michael Moorcock:
 1976, Legends From the End of Time, W. H. Allen (image: Mongrove).
 1976, The End of All Songs, Granada/Mayflower (image: Lord Jagged of Canaria).
 1976, The Transformation of Miss Mavis Ming, W. H. Allen (image: The Return of the Fireclown).
 1979, The Bull & The Spear, Granada (image: The Hound Master of Kerenos).
 1979, The Knight of the Swords, Granada (image: In the Flamelands).

Andre Norton:
 1977, Spell of the Witch World, Wyndham/Universal.
 1977, Three Against the Witch World, Wyndham/Universal.
 1977, Web of the Witch World, Wyndham/Universal.
 1977, Witch World, Wyndham/Universal.
 1978, Sorceress of the Witch World, Wyndham/Universal.
 1978, The Year of the Unicorn, Wyndham/Universal.
 1978, Trey of Swords, Wyndham/Universal.
 1978, Warlock of the Witch World, Wyndham/Universal.

Clark Ashton Smith:
 1976, Other Dimensions: Volume 1, Panther/Granada (image: Venus Cruiser).
 1976, Other Dimensions: Volume 2, Panther/Granada (image: The Ghoul).

Others:
 1977, Michael Moorcock (Editor), England Invaded: A Collection of Fantasy Fiction, W. H. Allen (image: The Monster of Lake La Metrie).
 1978, John Crowley, Beasts, Orbit/Futura (image: The Old Shot Tower).
 1978, Patricia A. McKillip, The Forgotten Beasts of Eld, New York: Avon Books.
 1978, Josef Nesvabda, In the Footsteps of the Abominable Snowman, New English Library.
 1979, Robert Lynn Asprin, The Bug Wars, New English Library.
 1985, Andrew Chapman, Steve Jackson and Ian Livingstone Present: Seas of Blood (Fighting Fantasy), Puffin Books.
 1986, Joseph O'Neill, Land Under England, Penguin Books (image: Beneath the Wall).
 1987, Worlds Without Words (Educational Resources), 4mation.
 1988, Jack Vance, Green Magic: The Fantasy Realms of Jack Vance, Tor (image: The Last Armada).
 1988, Jack Vance, Grüne Magie, Heyne (image: Tiger Moth).
 1992, Colin Duriez, The Tolkien and Middle-Earth Handbook, Monarch.
 1992, Naomi Starkey, Ends of the Earth, Minstrel/Kingsway.
 2009, Mark Jones, Bristol Folk, BFP (Matthews contributed a written piece and the book includes many of his images)
 2010, George Russell, Where the Bugs Wear Boots, George Russell Associates.

(Rodney Matthews' images have also been used on many international editions, particularly for Moorcock's German publishers.)

Magazine covers:

Vortex: The Science Fiction Fantasy:
 Vol. 1 No. 1, January 1977: Vortex, 1976.
 Vol. 1 No. 2, February 1977: Space Hijak, 1976.
 Vol. 1 No. 3, March 1977: Out of an Amber Sky, 1976.
 Commissioned, but unused: Metropolis Trap, 1977.
 Commissioned, but unused: The Crab, 1977.

Imagine (published by T.S.R. Hobbies (UK) Ltd):
 No. 1, April 1983: Elric and Moonglum, 1976.
 No. 9, December 1983: Imagine, 1982.
 No. 12, March 1984: The Guardian Awakes, 1982.
 No. 22, January 1985: Earl Aubec of Malador, 1984.
 Issue and date unknown: Araneida the Destroyer, 1983.
 Sales leaflet cover: Who Disturbs the Tyrant?, 1983.

FAB – The Gerry Anderson Fan Magazine:
 No. 32, 1998.
 No. 36, 1998.

Others:
 Software Communications Magazine, The Fury, 1988.
 Skivor & Band, The Rainbow Room, 1993.
 Classic Rock Trade Magazine, The Hop, 2003.

Bands and recordings 

Bands:
 The Cheetahs
 The Rhythm Cats
 Pentworth's People
 Barnaby Goode
 Originn
 Squidd

Recordings:
 Pentworth's People: Demo on vinyl (2 tracks)
 Squidd: Twice Upon a Time (3-track CD)
 Frog Riders: Utterly Spontaneous – Jam Session (7-track CD)
 Rudi Dobson & Rodney Matthews, featuring Tony Clarkin: The House on the Rock (3-track CD)
 Jeff Scheetz, Rodney Matthews & Friends (John Payne, Oliver Wakeman, Bob Catley and Pete Coleman): I Saw Three Ships (1-track CD)
Rodney Matthews and Oliver Wakeman: In the Bleak Midwinter (3-track CD)
Rodney Matthews and Jeff Scheetz with Oliver Wakeman: Trinity (10-track CD and 13-track double vinyl)

References

External links 

1945 births
Album-cover and concert-poster artists
Artists from Somerset
British speculative fiction artists
English illustrators
Fantasy artists
Living people
People from Paulton
Science fiction artists
British surrealist artists
Tolkien artists